The Braga Open is a professional tennis tournament played on outdoor clay courts. It is currently part of the ATP Challenger Tour. It is held annually in Braga, Portugal since 2018. The tournament has been installed with Braga's nomination as European City of Sport in 2018.

Past finals

Singles

Doubles

References

ATP Challenger Tour
Clay court tennis tournaments
Tennis tournaments in Portugal
Recurring sporting events established in 2018